Weston-super-Mare Rugby Football Club is an English rugby union team based in Weston-super-Mare, Somerset. The club runs five senior teams, including a colts and veterans side and the full range of junior teams  The first XV play in South West Premier, a level five league in the English rugby union system, following their promotion from Tribute South West 1 West in 2017.

The second XV (United) play in the Tribute Somerset Premier and the third XV (Athletic) play in Tribute Somerset 2 North.

History
The club was formed in 1875 and played their early games on what is now a supermarket car park before moving to their present ground at Drove Road in 1880. The Great Depression saw people from Wales arriving in the town, played rugby for Weston and became one of the top clubs in the country at that time. Recently they have had a resurgence in player attendance, overall improvement in facilities and a thriving social scene which has equated to success on the field.

Honours
1st team:
 Somerset Senior Cup winners (11): 1979, 1981, 2002, 2003, 2004, 2007, 2009, 2010, 2011, 2013, 2017
 South West 1 champions: 2001–02
 Somerset Division 3 South champions: 2008–09 
 South West 1 West champions: 2016–17
 Bristol Combination Cup winners: 2019

2nd team:
 Somerset 2 South champions: 2008–09

3rd team:
 Somerset 3 South champions: 2008–09

4th team:
 Somerset 3 South champions: 2016–17

International players
Eight former players have gone on to win international caps.

  1882–84 E L Strong 
  1885–91 W H Thomas 
  (RL) 1935 George Bennett
  1939 R E Price
  1967–73 Peter Larter
  1970 G F Redmond
  1984–97 Nigel Redman
  2010 Dan Tuohy
  2011 Jack Cuthbert

References

External links
 Official club website

English rugby union teams
Rugby clubs established in 1875
Rugby union in Somerset
Sport in Weston-super-Mare